The BL 13.5-inch Mk VI gun was a British heavy naval gun, originally ordered by the Ottoman Navy to equip its  dreadnoughts around 1911. The one ship completed was seized by the British Government when World War I began in August 1914 and became . Only 10 guns were built, to a design similar to that of their 45-calibre BL 13.5-inch Mk V naval gun. Designed by Vickers, they manufactured the guns of X and Y turrets, while Elswick Ordnance Company manufactured the guns of A, B, and Q turrets.

Weapons of comparable role, performance and era

 340mm/45 Modèle 1912 gun French equivalent

References

Bibliography

Friedman, Norman (2011). Naval Weapons of World War One. Barnsley, UK: Seaforth Publishing. 
Johnson and Buxton (2013). The Battleship Builders. Barnsley, UK: Seaforth Publishing.

External links
13.5-inch Mk VI on Navweaps

 

Naval guns of the United Kingdom
World War I naval weapons of the United Kingdom
Vickers
340 mm artillery